Witków  is a village in the administrative district of Gmina Czarny Bór, within Wałbrzych County, Lower Silesian Voivodeship, in south-western Poland. 

The village has an approximate population of 1,000.

References

Villages in Wałbrzych County